Monkey Business is a 1926 American short silent comedy film directed by Robert F. McGowan. It was the 48th Our Gang short subject released.

Cast

The Gang
 Joe Cobb as Joe
 Jackie Condon as Jackie
 Mickey Daniels as Mickey
 Johnny Downs as Johnny
 Allen Hoskins as Farina
 Mary Kornman as Mary
 Jay R. Smith as Jay
 Pal the dog as himself

Additional cast
 Jannie Hoskins as Mango
 Charles A. Bachman as Officer
 Harry Bowen as man repairing auto
 Ed Brandenburg as Patrol wagon driver
 William Gillespie as Officer
 Charlie Hall as Balloons vendor
 Anthony Mack as First officer

See also
 Our Gang filmography

References

External links

1926 films
1926 short films
American silent short films
American black-and-white films
1926 comedy films
Films directed by Robert F. McGowan
Hal Roach Studios short films
Our Gang films
1920s American films
Silent American comedy films